George Johnstone Stoney FRS (15 February 1826 – 5 July 1911) was an Irish physicist. He is most famous for introducing the term electron as the "fundamental unit quantity of electricity".

He had introduced the concept, though not the word, as early as 1874, initially naming it "electrine", and the word itself came in 1891. He published around 75 scientific papers during his lifetime.

Education and employment 
Stoney was born at Oakley Park, near Birr, County Offaly, in the Irish Midlands, the son of George Stoney (1792–) and Anne Blood (1801–1883). The Stoney family is an old-established Anglo-Irish family. He attended Trinity College Dublin, graduating with a B.A. degree in 1848. From 1848 to 1852 he worked as an astronomy assistant to William Parsons, 3rd Earl of Rosse at Birr Castle, County Offaly, where Parsons had built the world's largest telescope, the 72-inch Leviathan of Parsonstown. Simultaneously Stoney continued to study physics and mathematics and was awarded an M.A. by Trinity College Dublin in 1852.

From 1852 to 1857, Stoney was professor of physics at Queen's College Galway. From 1857 to 1882, he was employed as Secretary of the Queen's University of Ireland, an administrative job based in Dublin. In the early 1880s, he moved to the post of superintendent of Civil Service Examinations in Ireland, a post he held until his retirement in 1893. In that year, he took up residence in London, England. Stoney died in 1911 at his home in Notting Hill, London. Stoney continued his independent scientific research throughout his decades of non-scientific employment duties in Dublin. He also served for decades as honorary secretary and then vice-president of the Royal Dublin Society, a scientific society modelled after the Royal Society of London, and after his move to London Stoney served on the council of that society too. Additionally, he intermittently served on scientific review committees of the British Association for the Advancement of Science from the early 1860s on.

Scientific output
Stoney published seventy-five scientific papers in a variety of journals, but chiefly in the journals of the Royal Dublin Society. He made significant contributions to cosmic physics and to the theory of gases. He estimated the number of molecules in a cubic millimetre of gas, at room temperature and pressure, from data obtained from the kinetic theory of gases. Stoney's most important scientific work was the conception and calculation of the magnitude of the "atom of electricity". In 1891, he proposed the term 'electron' to describe the fundamental unit of electrical charge, and his contributions to research in this area laid the foundations for the eventual discovery of the particle by J. J. Thomson in 1897.

His scientific work was carried out in his spare time. A heliostat designed by Stoney is in the Science Museum Group collection.

Stoney was elected a Fellow of the Royal Society in June 1861 on the basis of being the author of papers on "The Propagation of Waves", "On the Rings seen in Fibrous Specimens of Calc Spar", and Molecular Physics, published in the Transactions of the Royal Irish Academy, et cetera, Distinguished for his acquaintance with the science of Astronomy & General Physics.

Stoney units

Stoney proposed the first system of natural units in 1881. He realized that a fixed amount of charge was transferred per chemical bond affected during electrolysis, the elementary charge e, which could serve as a unit of charge, and that combined with other known universal constants, namely the speed of light c and the Newtonian constant of gravitation G, a complete system of units could be derived. He showed how to derive units of mass, length, time and electric charge as base units. Due to the form in which Coulomb's law was expressed, the constant 4πε0 was implicitly included, ε0 being the vacuum permittivity.

Like Stoney, Planck independently derived a system of natural units (of similar scale) some decades after him, using different constants of nature.

Hermann Weyl made a notable attempt to construct a unified theory by associating a gravitational unit of charge with the Stoney length. Weyl's theory led to significant mathematical innovations but his theory is generally thought to lack physical significance.

Family 
Stoney married his cousin, Margaret Sophia Stoney, by whom he had had two sons and three daughters. For most of his decades in Dublin, Stoney resided in the Dundrum, Dublin neighbourhood. The street that he lived on was later renamed Stoney Road in his memory. After Stoney died in London, his cremated ashes were buried in St. Nahi's Church in Dundrum.

One of Stoney's sons, George Gerald Stoney FRS, was a scientist. His daughter Florence Stoney OBE was a radiologist while his daughter Edith is considered to be the first woman medical physicist. Stoney's most scientifically notable relative was his nephew, the Dublin-based physicist George Francis FitzGerald (1851–1901).

His brother was the engineer Bindon Blood Stoney.

Legacy

Stoney received an honorary Doctorate of Science (D.Sc.) from the University of Dublin in June 1902.

Stoney and FitzGerald were in regular communication on scientific matters. In addition, on political matters, both Stoney and FitzGerald were active opponents of the Irish Home Rule Movement. In their political opinion, the spirit of Irish Home Rule and later Irish nationalism was contrary to the spirit of science. Stoney resigned from his job as Secretary of Queen's University of Ireland in 1882 in objection to a government decision to introduce "sectarianism" into the system; i.e., Stoney wanted to keep the system non-denominational, but the government acceded to Irish Catholic demands for Catholic institutions.

In 1902, he was elected as a member to the American Philosophical Society.

Craters on Mars and the Moon are named in his honour.

See also

Basic concepts of quantum mechanics
Planck units
Stoney units

References

Bibliography
The Infancy of Atomic Physics. Hercules in His Cradle, by Alex Keller. Oxford University 1983.  
 

"The Constants of Nature, by John D. Barrow, Jonathan Cape, London 2002.

1826 births
1911 deaths
People from County Offaly
Alumni of Trinity College Dublin
Irish physicists
Academics of the University of Galway
Fellows of the Royal Society
People from Dundrum, Dublin
Members of the American Philosophical Society